The Concord Monument Square–Lexington Road Historic District is an historic district in Concord, Massachusetts.  Monument Square, at the center of the district, was laid out in 1635.  The district includes a collection of well-preserved residential houses stretching along Lexington Street southeast from the square, and along Lowell northwest of the square.  The square is prominently known as the site of British activities on April 19, 1775, the day of the Battles of Lexington and Concord which began the American Revolutionary War, and of earlier meetings by Massachusetts Patriots which were held in the First Parish Church and Wright's Tavern.  The Tavern and the Ralph Waldo Emerson House, which stands near the eastern end of the district, are both National Historic Landmarks.  The district was listed on the National Register of Historic Places in 1977.

See also
National Register of Historic Places listings in Concord, Massachusetts

References

1635 establishments in Massachusetts
Historic districts in Middlesex County, Massachusetts
Concord, Massachusetts
National Register of Historic Places in Concord, Massachusetts
Historic districts on the National Register of Historic Places in Massachusetts